Duane is a surname. Notable persons with that surname include:

 Anthony Duane (1679–1747), Irish born American settler, father of James Duane
 Diane Duane (born 1952), American science fiction and fantasy author
 James Duane (1733–1797), American lawyer, jurist, Continental Congressman, Revolutionary leader, and Mayor of New York City
 James Duane (professor) (born 1959), American legal academic
 James Chatham Duane (1824–1897), American engineering officer in the Union Army during the American Civil War
 Michael Duane (1915–1997), Irish-born British progressive educationalist and headteacher
 Ronnie Duane, rugby league footballer of the 1980s and 1990s
 Thomas Duane (born 1955), American member of the New York State Senate
 William Duane (physicist) (1872–1935), American physicist
 William John Duane (1780–1865), Irish born American politician and lawyer